Media Manager for PSP is a commercial application from Sony Creative Software that managed content on the PlayStation Portable (PSP), serving a similar function to that of iTunes for a personal computer. Media Manager is able to automatically convert and copy certain types of content (such as music & photos) to a PlayStation Portable, as well as download and copy video podcasts to the device; music could be downloaded from the Sony Connect Internet-based music store, in countries where this service was offered and from version 3.x onwards, the PlayStation Store was integrated directly into the software.

Media Manager for PSP was typically not included with the purchase of a PlayStation Portable and had to be purchased separately for a small fee, however from version 3.x onwards, a "basic" version of the software was made available for free in most countries via their respective PlayStation Web site; users of the "basic" version were able to purchase a "Pro" version for a small fee, that primarily offered the benefit of being able to convert and copy video files to a PlayStation Portable (this feature was unavailable in the "basic", free version from version 3.x onwards).

In the past, Sony Creative Software offered a range of "Media Manager" titles for different devices (such as the PlayStation Portable, Sony Walkman range and compatible Sony Ericsson cell phones), however Sony Creative Software have recently combined some of the Media Manager applications for different devices into one application, calling it "Media Go" – this includes Media Manager for PSP (PlayStation Portable), which is no longer being sold because of this reason.

External links
Media Go product page & free download
PSP (PlayStation Portable) Web site

Media Manager
Sony software